Colonel Sir Mervyn James Wheatley CBE (24 April 1880 – 26 October 1974) was a British Army officer and a Conservative Party politician.

Wheatley served in the Second Boer War in South Africa, where he took part in operations in Natal from March to June 1900, including action at Laing's Nek; then at Transvaal and in the Orange River Colony. He received a regular commission as a second lieutenant in the Dorsetshire Regiment on 27 July 1901. He stayed in South Africa throughout the war, which ended June 1902 with the Peace of Vereeniging. Four months later he left Cape Town with other officers and men of the 2nd battalion Dorset regiment on the SS German in late September 1902, and arrived at Southampton in late October, when they were posted to Portland.

He later gained the rank of colonel.

Wheatley was the Member of Parliament (MP) for East Dorset from 1945 to 1950 and for Poole from 1950 to 1951.

References

External links 
 

1880 births
1974 deaths
Conservative Party (UK) MPs for English constituencies
UK MPs 1945–1950
UK MPs 1950–1951
Commanders of the Order of the British Empire
Dorset Regiment officers
Knights Commander of the Order of the British Empire
Politicians from Dorset
British Army personnel of the Second Boer War